Bandicam (stylized as BANDICAM) is a closed-source screen capture and screen recording software originally developed by Bandisoft and later by Bandicam Company that can take screenshots or record screen changes.

Bandicam consists of three main modes. One is the Screen Recording mode, which can be used for recording a certain area on the PC screen. The other is the Game Recording mode, which can record the target created in DirectX or OpenGL. And the last is the Device Recording mode which records Webcams and HDMI devices.

Bandicam displays an FPS count in the corner of the screen while the DirectX/OpenGL window is in active mode. When the FPS count is shown in green, it means the program is ready to record, and when it starts recording, it changes the color of the FPS count to red. The FPS count is not displayed when the program is recording in the Screen Recording mode. This software has a maximum frame rate of 144 FPS.

Bandicam is shareware, meaning that it can be tested free of charge with limited functionality (It is often called crippleware). The free version of Bandicam places its name as a watermark at the top of every recorded video, and each recorded video is limited to 10 minutes in length. However, users can adjust the screen margin with the video screen so that the watermark is off-screen from the video.

The created video can be saved in AVI or MP4 formats. Bandicam can also capture screenshots and save them as BMP, PNG, or JPG. Bandicam features an autocomplete recording mode which can limit the video capture process to a specified size or time value.

It supports hardware acceleration through Nvidia NVENC/HEVC, CUDA, AMD APP and Intel Quick Sync Video/HEVC.

See also 
 Crippleware
 Comparison of screencasting software

References

External links
 
 Official Reseller

2009 software
Screencasting software
Screenshot software
Windows-only software